F. aurea  may refer to:
 Ferdinandea aurea, a hoverfly species in the genus Ferdinandea
 Ficus aurea, the Florida strangler fig, golden fig or higuerón, a tree species native to Florida, the northern and western Caribbean, southern Mexico and Central America south to Panama

See also
 Aurea (disambiguation)